Attila Pintér may refer to:
Attila Pintér (footballer, born 1966), Hungarian football manager and former player
Attila Pintér (footballer, born 1978), Hungarian football defender